Lavinia is an unincorporated community in Calhoun County, Iowa, in the United States.

History
Lavinia was platted and laid out in 1899. Its population in 1915 was 69.

References

Unincorporated communities in Calhoun County, Iowa
Unincorporated communities in Iowa